During the 2002–03 English football season, Mansfield Town Football Club competed in the Football League Second Division where they finished in 23rd position with 44 points, suffering an intimidate return to the fourth tier. Mansfield's downfall was their leaky defence as despite scoring 66 goals they conceded 97, the most of any team in 2002–03.

Final league table

Results
Mansfield Town's score comes first

Legend

Football League Second Division

FA Cup

League Cup

Football League Trophy

Squad statistics

References
General
Mansfield Town 2002–03 at soccerbase.com (use drop down list to select relevant season)

Specific

Mansfield Town F.C. seasons
Mansfield Town